Tuk is a village in the municipality of Rovišće in Bjelovar-Bilogora County in Croatia. According to the census of 2013, it has 354 inhabitants.

References 

Populated places in Bjelovar-Bilogora County